Fathia is a feminine given name. Notable people with the name include:

Fathia Absie, Somali-American writer, producer, actor and filmmaker
Fathia al-Assal (1933–2014), Egyptian playwright and activist
Faithia Balogun, film actor
Fathia Ali Bouraleh (born 1987), track and field sprint athlete who competes for Djibouti
Fathia Ghali (1930–1976), Princess of Egypt until 1950
Fathia Latiff, Malaysian actress and model
Fathia Nkrumah, First Lady of Ghana

Feminine given names